Galam Kabud-e Sofla (also Romanized as Galam Kabūd-e Soflá) is a village in Howmeh-ye Sarpol Rural District, in the Central District of Sarpol-e Zahab County, Kermanshah Province, Iran. At the 2006 census, its population was 112, in 23 families.

References 

Populated places in Sarpol-e Zahab County